The Medicine River is a medium-sized river in central Alberta. It begins at the outlet of Medicine Lake, north of Rocky Mountain House. The river flows southeast, taking on a number of creeks before passing Eckville. The Medicine River joins the Red Deer River north of Innisfail, downstream of the Dickson Dam, at the Medicine Flats. The Medicine is bridged by Alberta highways 53, 12, 11, and 54.

The name Medicine River is a translation from the Cree words muskiki and nipagwasimow, or Sundance river. It first appeared on a John Arrowsmith map in 1859.

Tributaries

Open Creek
Wilson Creek
Welch Creek
Block Creek
Wood Lake
Blueberry Creek
Lobstick Creek
Lasthill Creek
Tindastoll Creek
Dickson Creek

See also
List of Alberta rivers

References

Rivers of Alberta